Norbert Henry Zauchin (November 17, 1929 – January 31, 1999) was a professional baseball first baseman. He played all or part of six seasons in Major League Baseball for the Boston Red Sox (1951, 1955–57) and Washington Senators (1958–59). In a six-season career, Zauchin was a .233 hitter with 50 home runs and 159 RBI in 346 games. He is most remembered for driving in 10 runs during a major league game.

A native of Royal Oak, Michigan, Zauchin graduated from Royal Oak High School in 1948. He served two years in the United States Army during the Korean War and then became a major league baseball player.  He started his professional career in 1950 with the Double-A Birmingham Barons, where he set a Rickwood Field field record with 35 home runs.

His most productive season came in 1955, when he hit .239 with 27 home runs for the Red Sox and finished third in American League Rookie of the Year voting, behind Herb Score and Billy Klaus. Zauchin played in 130 games and led AL first basemen in fielding percentage (.995). On May 27, 1955, Zauchin collected 10 RBI with three home runs and a double in the first five innings of a 16–0 victory over Washington.

Before the 1958 season, Zauchin was traded with Albie Pearson to the Senators for Pete Runnels. Zauchin retired in 1960 after spending his last year in the minor leagues.

Zauchin died from prostate cancer in Birmingham, Alabama at the age of 69. He was inducted into the Royal Oak High School Hall of Fame in 1997. His grandson, Chad Smith, is a baseball player.

References

External links
Norm Zauchin Baseball Biography

The Deadball Era 

1929 births
1999 deaths
Baseball players from Michigan
Birmingham Barons players
Boston Red Sox players
Buffalo Bisons (minor league) players
Deaths from cancer in Alabama
Deaths from prostate cancer
Louisville Colonels (minor league) players
Major League Baseball first basemen
Miami Marlins (IL) players
Milford Red Sox players
San Jose Red Sox players
Scranton Red Sox players
Sportspeople from Royal Oak, Michigan
Washington Senators (1901–1960) players
United States Army personnel of the Korean War